SwissGear is a Swiss clothing, luggage, and accessory company that is branded as part of the maker of Swiss Army knives. The company is owned by Wenger and its products are licensed in North America by Group III International Ltd. SwissGear also sells watches, that are manufactured by Wenger and branded under the SwissGear name, known as "SwissGear Legacy Watches".

In 2015, SwissGear offered on $5,000 and two $2,500 scholarships for incoming university students, known as the "Ultimate Backpack Scholarship".

References

External links

Swiss brands
Victorinox
Watch brands
Luggage brands
Luggage manufacturers
Companies of Switzerland
Leather manufacturers